Chasing Life is an American drama series on ABC Family that premiered on June 10, 2014. The series follows 24-year-old April (Italia Ricci), a smart and quick-witted aspiring journalist who is diagnosed with leukemia by her estranged uncle George (Steven Weber). April must deal with the impact of her diagnosis on her career as well as her family and friends - her best friend and confidant Beth (Aisha Dee), widowed mom Sara (Mary Page Keller), rebellious little sister Brenna (Haley Ramm), and her sweet grandmother Emma (Rebecca Schull) - and her budding relationship with her coworker Dominic (Richard Brancatisano). On November 27, 2013, ahead of its premiere, Chasing Life was picked up for a full season, and later an additional episode functioning as a Christmas special. On November 6, 2014, Chasing Life was renewed for a second season. The second season premiered on July 6, 2015, and ended on September 28, 2015. On October 2, 2015, Chasing Life was officially canceled after two seasons, with a total of 34 episodes produced.

Series overview

Episodes

Season 1 (2014–15)

Season 2 (2015)

References

Chasing Life